Lavinia is an unincorporated community in Carroll County, Tennessee, United States. In 1822, Lavinia was organized as a community. In 1950, Lavinia School was destroyed by a fire.

Demographics

References

Unincorporated communities in Carroll County, Tennessee
Unincorporated communities in Tennessee